Gambia–Turkey relations are the foreign relations between Gambia and Turkey.

Diplomatic relations 

Gambia and Turkey had generally friendly relations. Despite widespread skepticism about its survival, Gambia retained its sovereignty despite persistent Senegalese pressure for union and numerous ethnic groups that plagued the security of other countries. Dawda Jawara’s deliberate policy of converting the PPP from a Mandinka-dominated organization into a nationwide party enabled inter-ethnic cooperation and boosted Gambia's well-earned reputation for a beacon of democracy. Turkey has been very supportive of Gambia under Dawda Jawara and facilitated its economic situation with developmental and financial aid along with an Economic Recovery Program designed by the World Bank and IMF in 1985.

Relations detonated on July 22, 1994 when a group of disaffected junior army officers seized power in a bloodless coup that allowed safe passage to President Dawda Jawara out of the country. Despite President Dawda Jawara's Gambia's well-earned reputation as one of the few democratic regimes in Africa, Western allies were late in coming to the rescue of Jawara’s government. Turkey, along with Western allies, promptly cut off aid to the military junta led by Yahya Jammeh and imposed further sanctions. 

Relations improved in 1996–1997 with a formal return to elections and Turkey lifted economic sanctions that had thrown Gambia's economy into chaos.

Economic relations 
 Trade volume between the two countries was negligible in 2018.

 There are direct flights from Istanbul to Banjul since November 26, 2018.

Educational relations 
 Turkish Maarif Foundation operates in Banjul since October 2017.

See also 

 Foreign relations of Gambia
 Foreign relations of Turkey

References

Further reading  
 “A Fresh Start.” West Africa, 27 January–2 February 1997: p. 147.
 “Post-Coup Politics in The Gambia.” Journal of Democracy 13, 4 (2002): pp. 167–72. 
 “The Gambia: From Coup to Elections.” Journal of Democracy 9, 2 (1998): pp. 64–75. 
  “The Gambia's Changing Political, Economic, and Social Landscape: A Regime(s) Performance Evaluation, 1994–2002.” Africa Insight 33, 3 (2003): pp. 57–64.
 “The Gambia's ‘Elected Autocrat Poverty, Peripherality, and Political Instability,’ 1994–2006.” Armed Forces & Society 34, 3 (2008): pp. 450–73.
 “The Military and ‘Democratization’ in The Gambia: 1994–2002.” In Political Liberalization and Democratization in Africa: Lessons from Country Experiences, eds. Julius O. Ihonvbere and John M. Mbaku, pp. 179–96. 
 Ajayi, Simon Ademola. Yahya Jammeh and the Gambian Revolution: 1994–2001. Ibadan, Nigeria: Stirling-Horden, 2003. 
 Baldeh, Ebrima. “Gambia's First University Proves Its Worth.” New African, April 2007: p. 40. 
 Bojang, Sheriff. “Who's for President?” New African, March 2006: p. 22. Ceesay, Ebrima J. The Military and ‘Democratisation’ in The Gambia: 1994–2003. Victoria, BC, Canada: Trafford, 2006.
 Commonwealth Observer Group. The Gambia Presidential Election: 18th October 2001. London: Commonwealth Secretariat, 2002.
 Dabo, Bakary B. “Living in Crisis.” West Africa, 13–19 February 1995: pp. 217–18.
 Kandeh, Jimmy D. “What Does the ‘Militariat’ Do When It Rules? Military Regimes: The Gambia, Sierra Leone and Liberia.” Review of African Political Economy 69 (1996): pp. 387–404. 
 N’Diaye, Boubacar, Abdoulaye Saine, and Mathurin Houngnikpo. Not Yet Democracy: West Africa's Slow Farewell to Authoritarianism. Durham, N.C.: Carolina Academic Press, 2005: pp. 51–106.
 Obadare, Ebenezer. “The Military and Democracy in The Gambia.” In Governance and Democratisation in West Africa, eds. Dele Olowu, Adebayo Williams, and Kayode Soremekun, pp. 343–57. Dakar, Senegal: CODESRIA, 1999. 
 Perfect, David. “Politics and Society in The Gambia since Independence.” History Compass 6, 2 (2008): pp. 426–38. 
 Saine, Abdoulaye S. M. “The 1996/1997 Presidential and National Assembly Elections in The Gambia.” Electoral Studies 16, 4 (1997): 554–59. 
 Wiseman, John A. “Military Rule in The Gambia: An Interim Assessment.” Third World Quarterly 17, 5 (1996): pp. 917–40.

Turkey
Gambia